Dora Boothby and Winifred McNair defeated Dorothea Lambert Chambers and Charlotte Sterry in the final, 4–6, 2–4 retired to win the inaugural Ladies' Doubles tennis title at the 1913 Wimbledon Championships.

Draw

Finals

Top half

Bottom half

References

External links

Women's Doubles
Wimbledon Championship by year – Women's doubles
Wimbledon Championships - Doubles
Wimbledon Championships - Doubles